The 2012 Emirates Cup of Nations is the second Cup of Nations tournament to be hosted by the United Arab Emirates and will be again held at The Sevens Stadium in Dubai.  This tournament acts as a year ending tournament for tier 3 teams from different continents and provides greater preparation for teams to play in their regional competitions.

The tournament is a joint initiative of the UAE Rugby Federation and the Hong Kong Rugby Football Union.

The four competing teams are hosts UAE, 2012 Asian Five Nations runners up Hong Kong, 2012 Africa Cup champions Zimbabwe and 2010-2012 European Nations Cup Division 1B champions Belgium.

Zimbabwe will send a weakened squad to the tournament, due to the clash with the 2012 South Africa Sevens, for which Zimbabwe has qualified.

An earlier draw for the event  had six teams playing, with Papua New Guinea and Mexico playing alongside the four competing nations.  However, both teams withdrew due to financial problems.

Belgium won the tournament, defeating defending champions Hong Kong on the third and final match day, 24-12.  Hong Kong were runners up, with Zimbabwe taking third place, defeating United Arab Emirates.

Format
The tournament is being played as a single round-robin, with the winner being the leading team after the third round of fixtures.  The points for the tournament were awarded for:
Win =  4 points
Draw = 2 points
Loss = 1 point
Scoring 4 or more tries in one game = 1 bonus point
Losing by 7 or less points = 1 bonus point

Fixtures and results

Pre-tournament rankings in parentheses

See also
2011 Cup of Nations
2012 Asian Five Nations
2010–12 European Nations Cup First Division
2012 Africa Cup

External links
 EACON Website

References

2012
2012 rugby union tournaments for national teams
International rugby union competitions hosted by the United Arab Emirates
rugby union
2012 in Asian rugby union
2012–13 in Belgian rugby union
rugby union
rugby union
December 2012 sports events in Asia